St. Casimir Church may refer to several Roman Catholic churches:

Lithuania
Church of St. Casimir, Naujoji Vilnia
Church of St. Casimir, Vilnius

Poland
Church of St. Casimir the Prince, Kraków 
St. Kazimierz Church, Warsaw
St. Casimir the Prince Church, Września

United Kingdom
St Casimir's Lithuanian Church, Bethnal Green, London

United States
St. Casimir Lithuanian Roman Catholic Church, Sioux City, Iowa
St. Casimir Church, Baltimore, Maryland
Church of St. Casimir (Saint Paul, Minnesota)
St. Casimir's Roman Catholic Church (Newark, New Jersey)
St. Casimir's Roman Catholic Church, now the Paul Robeson Theater, a New York City Designated Landmark in Brooklyn, New York
St. Casimir Church (Cleveland, Ohio)

See also
St. Casimir Parish (disambiguation)